Alexey Nikolayevich Lysenkov (born January 26, 1965, Kiev) is a Russian television presenter. He is pro-rector of the International Institute for Film, showman, Television and Radio Broadcasting.

He studied at the Shchukin School under Alla Kazanskaya.

References

External links
  Алексей Лысенков

1965 births
Living people
Russian male actors
Russian male television actors
Russian television presenters
Television presenters from Kyiv
20th-century Russian people